Kjetil Haug (born 12 June 1998) is a Norwegian professional footballer who plays as a goalkeeper for Ligue 1 club Toulouse.

Club career 
Playing youth football for Kvik Halden FK and Sarpsborg 08 FF, he spent time in the Manchester City FC Academy. He returned to Norway and Sogndal in 2018. Playing two cup games for Sogndal, he was loaned out to Elverum in 2018 and to Vålerenga in 2019. Here he played once in the cup. The move to Vålerenga was made permanent in the summer of 2019. He made his Vålerenga debut in July 2020.

On 28 June 2022, he joined Toulouse.

Career statistics

References

1998 births
Living people
People from Halden
Sportspeople from Viken (county)
Norwegian footballers
Association football goalkeepers
Sogndal Fotball players
Elverum Fotball players
Vålerenga Fotball players
Toulouse FC players
Eliteserien players
Norway youth international footballers
Norway under-21 international footballers
Norwegian expatriate footballers
Norwegian expatriate sportspeople in England
Expatriate footballers in England
Norwegian expatriate sportspeople in France
Expatriate footballers in France